Grace Episcopal Church is an historic Episcopal church located at St. Francisville, West Feliciana Parish, Louisiana. The congregation was organized in 1827. The present church was completed in 1860, but it was heavily damaged by Union gunboats in 1863, during the Civil War.

The current appearance of the church dates to its repair and rebuilding in 1893. The organ dates to 1860. The church is one of the state's oldest Protestant churches.

Notable burials
Martha Hilliard Barrow Turnbull - owner of Rosedown Plantation
Robert Hilliard Barrow - four-star General in the U.S. Marine Corps.
John Bennett Dawson - 19th-century Louisiana Congressman. 
John Elliott Hart - Union Navy officer that died nearby on the Mississippi River; whose 1863 funeral has been commemorated, since 1999, with a festival, "The Day the War Stopped".
Junius Wallace Jones - Major General, United States Air Force.
Samuel Lawrason - state senator, author of the Lawrason Act of 1898.
William Walter Leake - Confederate cavalry officer, who facilitated the Masonic burial of John E. Hart, above; later a state senator, circuit court judge, and newspaper publisher.
George Mathews Jr. - presiding Judge of the Louisiana Supreme Court, 1813–1836.
Joseph P. Newsham - 19th-century Congressman; he had served in the Union Army during the Civil War and moved to Louisiana after receiving disabling injuries.

References

External links

Grace Episcopal Church, St. Francisville official site
Grace Episcopal Cemetery on Find a Grave

Episcopal church buildings in Louisiana
Churches in West Feliciana Parish, Louisiana